I Kiss the Hand (also known as Family Killer) is a 1973 Italian crime film directed  by Vittorio Schiraldi and starring Arthur Kennedy, John Saxon and Agostina Belli. It is based on a novel by the same Vittorio Schiraldi, a writer and journalist at his film debut.

Plot

Cast

Arthur Kennedy as Don Angelino Ferrante
John Saxon as  Gaspare Ardizzone
Agostina Belli as  Mariuccia
Pino Colizzi as  Masino D'Amico
Spiros Focás as  Luca Ferrante
 Paolo Turco as Massimo Ferrante
Marino Masé as Luciano Ferrante
Corrado Gaipa as Don Emilio Grisanti
Giuseppe Addobbati as  Nicola D'Amico
Joshua Sinclair as Stefano Ferrante
Daniele Vargas as Don Santino Billeci
 Accursio Di Leo as Pietro Corazza 
Jane Avril as Prostitute 
 Massimo Sarchielli as Totò Grisanti
Tino Bianchi as Pietrino Gambara

Reception
Film critic Roberto Curti referred to the film as "a turgid, verbose and violent melodrama", in which the "only memorable asset is John Saxon’s over-the-top performance".

References

External links

Italian crime films
1973 crime films
1973 films
Mafia films
1973 directorial debut films
Golan-Globus films
1970s Italian films